Aptiganel (Cerestat; CNS-1102) is an unsuccessful drug candidate which acts as a noncompetitive NMDA antagonist, and that was under development by Cambridge Neuroscience, Inc as a treatment for stroke. It has neuroprotective effects and was researched for potential use in the treatment of stroke, but despite positive results in animal studies, human trials showed limited efficacy, as well as undesirable side effects such as sedation and hallucinations, and clinical development was ultimately not continued.  

The drug's failure led to the collapse of Cambridge Neuroscience in 1998 and its eventual sale to CeNeS Pharmaceuticals in 2000.

Other guanidine substances that the company had been bowling on was Cns-1145 & CNS1237.

Synthesis

1-Naphthylamine is reacted with cyanogen bromide to give 2. Treatment of this intermediate with 3-ethyl-N-methylaniline leads to addition to the cyano group and formation of the corresponding diaryl guanidine, aptiganel, 3.

See also 
 Ditolylguanidine
CNS1237 shares predominantly most of the same structural entities.

References 

NMDA receptor antagonists
Guanidines
Naphthylamines
Anilines